Baron Greenwich was a title in the Peerage of the United Kingdom that has been created twice in British history.

History 
The first creation came in the Peerage of Great Britain in 1767 when Lady Caroline Townshend was made Baroness Greenwich, in the County of Kent, with remainder to the male issue by her second husband, Charles Townshend. She was the daughter of Field Marshal The 2nd Duke of Argyll, who had been created Earl of Greenwich in 1715 and Duke of Greenwich in 1719, titles which became extinct on his death in 1743. As Caroline's two sons by her second husband predeceased her, the title became extinct upon her death in 1794.

The second creation came in the Peerage of the United Kingdom in 1947 when Lieutenant Philip Mountbatten, on the morning of his wedding to Princess Elizabeth (who became Queen Elizabeth II), was made Baron Greenwich, of Greenwich in the County of London. He was made Duke of Edinburgh and Earl of Merioneth at the same time. Prince Philip died in 2021, and the title passed to his son Prince Charles, until it merged with the crown when Charles became King in 2022.

Baronesses Greenwich; First creation (1767)

Caroline Townshend, 1st Baroness Greenwich (1717–1794)

Barons Greenwich; Second creation (1947)
Prince Philip, Duke of Edinburgh (1921–2021), 1st Baron Greenwich.
Charles, Prince of Wales (b. 1948), 2nd Baron, eldest son of Prince Philip, Duke of Edinburgh.
Prince Charles succeeded as Charles III in 2022 upon his mother's death, and his hereditary titles merged in the Crown.

References

Other information

 
Extinct baronies in the Peerage of the United Kingdom
Prince Philip, Duke of Edinburgh
1767 establishments in Great Britain
Noble titles created in 1947
Noble titles created in 1767
Peerages created with special remainders
British and Irish peerages which merged in the Crown
1947 establishments in the United Kingdom
2022 disestablishments in the United Kingdom
Charles III